Duck Lake (also known as Lake Wahbekaness and formerly Betsey Lake) is a large lake in the Lower Peninsula of the U.S. state of Michigan. Located within Green Lake Township, Grand Traverse County, Duck Lake is one of two lakes the forms the isthmus of Interlochen, the other being Green Lake. Duck Lake and Green Lake form part of the headwaters of the Betsie River, which flows west from Green Lake through Benzie County to Lake Michigan at Frankfort and Elberta.

Also between Duck Lake and Green Lake are Interlochen State Park and Interlochen Center for the Arts, a prestigious boarding school.

See also 

 List of lakes in Michigan

References 

Lakes of Michigan
Lakes of Grand Traverse County, Michigan